Toward; is a village near Dunoon, Scotland, at the southern tip of the Cowal peninsula.

During the Second World War, the Toward area was a training centre called HMS Brontosaurus also known as the No 2 Combined Training Centre (CTC), based at Castle Toward.

Castle Toward

Nearby is Castle Toward, a former country house built close to the ruined Toward Castle. Castle Toward was used as an outdoor education centre. The grounds were also used as a location for the children's BBC TV series Raven. Sold by Argyll and Bute Council to a private individual in 2016.

Toward Point Lighthouse

Toward Point has one of the eighteen lighthouses built by Robert Stevenson.

Highland Boundary Fault

The Highland Boundary Fault passes Toward, as it crosses Scotland from Isle of Arran in the west to Stonehaven on the east coast.  The geological fault line formed around 430 million years ago.

Sports
Toward Sailing Club provides racing, cruising and training.

Gallery

References

External links

Toward
Toward
Highlands and Islands of Scotland
Highland Boundary Fault